Imre Czomba (born September 9, 1972) is a Los Angeles-based Hungarian-American composer, film composer, orchestrator, arranger, music producer, and musician. A prominent figure in the international music scene since 1993, he is most recognized for his numerous theatrical compositions and productions, including musicals, international events, and dance theatre shows. Imre earned international acclaim for his 18-year collaboration with ExperiDance, a famous dance troupe whose shows premiered in top theaters across Europe and Asia. His international repertoire includes compositions for the 2008 Summer and 2014 Winter Olympic Games, and the 2013 European Judo Championship, and the 2006 European Aquatic Championship Official Song. In 2008 and 2009 Imre was selected to compose music for the prestigious Hungarian National Day firework shows, each with a viewership of over 3 million people. Czomba has worked with world-famous star friends as Kenny G, Michael Boddicker, Alphonso Johnson (Weather Report, Santana), Ed Calle (Gloria Estefan, Michael Bolton), Richie Garcia (Phill Collins band), Michael O'Neill (musician) (Barbra Streisand band) etc. on his #QuarantineMusicChain project.

Early life
At an early point in his career, Imre was inspired by the blues, which can be clearly heard in his piano playing. He has been a member of several top blues bands and has performed on the same stages with B. B. King, Sting, Zucchero, Pink and Robben Ford.  Imre has appeared on over 110 albums and as a composer, arranger, orchestrator, music producer, and musician. He has been the recipient of 18 Gold, 14 Platinum and 4 Double Platinum albums. In the pop music world, his most notable success was with the band Nox, who went on to win a number of local awards, including the Golden Giraffe.

Quarantine Music Chain
Czomba's friends joined from sixteen countries on this truly diverse and exciting musical trip. Stars from the US, Germany, Australia, Canada, Egypt, Norway, Slovakia, France, Germany, New Zealand, China, Russia, Israel, Norway, Argentina, and  Hungary, and of course from Hollywood, appear in the production - composers, musicians, and singers alike. The internationally acclaimed artist initially called only a few of his friends to see if they would like to take part in a joint song recorded from home, but his list was filled in moments with yeses from stars like Kenny G, Michael Boddicker, Alphonso Johnson (Weather Report, Santana), Ed Calle(Gloria Estefan, Michael Bolton), Richie Garcia (Phill Collins band), Sara Andon, Andrew Kesler (Accent), Michael O'Neill (musician) (Barbra Streisand band), etc. Czomba, in response to the constraints, conducted a joint jam session recorded from home with the help of more than 100 famous co-creators. However, the music was not composed by an artist alone, but it was born in a special way, as a result of the inspiring voices of more composers.

Why the Sun and the Moon live in the sky ft. Chloe x Halle (Vogue Magazine US)
In 2021 Imre Czomba has an opportunity to compose music for a short film for VOGUE magazine, called "Why the Sun and the Moon Live in the Sky" based on a Nigerian folktale. The director is the iconic Julie Dash, and the two lead actresses are Halle Bailey and Chloe Bailey. They are the Chloe x Halle R&B musical duo.

Theatre
In 2000 Imre's career took a different turn when he was asked to compose music for several successful plays such as Merlin Theatre's Deathtrap. That experience leads to a meeting with choreographer Sandor Roman with whom Imre developed the unique harmony of dance and music for ExperiDance. The dance group is committed to the heritage of Hungarian folk dance. Imre is successfully composing an outstanding music repertoire built around Hungarian folk music but also manages to step outside its boundaries. This new musical direction has turned into a romantic and grandiose part of world music. These stage shows are regularly played on the main stages of Budapest's top theaters, and in bigger cities countrywide as guest performances. He has many successful musical plays, for example, Birth of a Country(2007). The shows were performed with 250 dancers and 10 singers at Budapest's most famous Hero Square. Untouchables(2012) played at the Margaret Island Open-Air Stage and The Taming of the Shrew (Makrancos Kata)(2013) played at the RaM Colosseum.

Sporting Events Official Songs
In 2006 Imre also got the opportunity to compose the official song of the 2006 European Aquatics Championships. Sports lovers all over the continent enjoyed the song and it went platinum on the day of its CD release. This led to Imre composing the Hungarian Olympic Team's official song in 2008, the Judo European Championship's official song in 2013, and Evgeni Plushenko's Russian National Championship and Winter Olympic Music. Imre song is the official song of the Judo World Championship in 2021, it's called “Judo for you”.

Theatre works
2016 Penetration – Fringe Hollywood, Los Angeles
2016 Benyovszky (Orchestrator) – Budapest
2016 Nostradamus – Budapest
2015 I, Leonardo – Milano
2014 A Night in Venice – RaM Colosseum, Budapest
2014 Játékkészítő (The Game Creator) – (Score Composer) Tüskecsarnok, Budapest
2013 The Taming of the Shrew – RaM Colosseum, Budapest
2013 Radnóti – RaM Colosseum, Budapest
2012 Untouchable – Margaret Island Open-Air Stage, Budapest
2011 Liliomfi - Palace of the Arts, Budapest
2011 The Person of the King – RaM Colosseum, Budapest
2009 Happines 69:09 – Palace of the Arts, Budapest
2008 Measure for measure – National Dance Theatre, Budapest
2007 Essence – Beijing
2007 The Birth of a country – Hero Square, Budapest
2006 Festen – Pesti Theatre, Budapest
2006 Gypsies of Nagyida – National Dance Theatre, Budapest
2005 Steel, the legend of the metal – Bolzan Urban Theatre
2002 Revans – National Theatre, Budapest
2001 One Thousand and one year – Szolnoki Szigligeti Theatre
2001 Deathtrap – Merlin Theatre, Budapest
2000 E.Tango – Thalia Theatre, Budapest

Fireworks Music Budapest
He was highly honored with an invitation to write music for the Hungarian National Day's fireworks in 2008 and 2009. With over 3 million viewers, it was an unforgettable moment in his professional life.

Television, Film
He next turned to television as a composer and music producer, working on shows such as "Csináljuk a fesztivált," a popular new TV program that features the biggest hits in the last 50 years in 93 Episodes.
In 2013, Imre moved to Los Angeles. Since then he has scored several International Film and TV Productions, and composed music for the Hungarian hit movies Argo 2 (Action Comedy)and the Kölcsönlakás (Comedy).

Film, Documentary, and TV Works
2021 Why the Sun x the Moon live in the sky ft. Chloe x Halle (Vogue US) (Short Film)
2021 A Thousand Little Cuts (Feature Film)
2020 Moving Past Trauma (Documentary)
2020 Unfinished Business (Short Film)
2020 Obscene Beauty (Feature Film)
2019 Canary in a mine (Short Film)
2019 Twisted Sisters (TV series)
2019 Courage of Eva Kollar (Short Film)
2019 Kölcsönlakás (Feature Film)
2018 Tesla Files (TV series)
2018 JDM Legends (TV Series)
2018 It's Suppertime! (TV Series)
2018 Apacheria (Feature Film)
2018 Akil (Short Film)
2017 Beneath the Leaves (orchestrator) (Feature Film)
2017 Eva Kolosvary Artist at 80 (Documentary)
2015–2018 Celebrity Opera Series at Broad Stage (TV series) (music supervisor)
2016 Search Party in Beverly Hills (Short Film)
2016 Last Vow (Short Film)
2015 The Coffin Footage (Feature Film)
2015 Argo2, Action Comedy (Feature Film)
2014 Cinema Inferno (TV movie) 
2014 The True Adventures of Raoul Walsh (Feature Documentary) 
2014 Chance of a Lifetime (Short Film)
2014 Kényszerszinglik (TV film)
2014 Midnight in Hollywood (Short film)
2014 Countryside Encounters: Out of the city (TV Film)
2013 Water, Our Past and Future (TV series)
2013 Matter Death and Life (Documentary Film)
2012 Becsengetünk és elfutunk (TV series)
2012 Meldrum House (Short Film)
2011 Flow (Documentary Film)
2011 Nagy duett (TV Show Series)
2011 Two Hearts (TV Show)
2011 Csináljuk a fesztivált VI, TV (TV Show Series)
2010 10 éves az Experidance (Documentary Film)
2010 Csináljuk a fesztivált V (TV Show Series)
2009 Fireworks Budapest (TV Film)
2009 Revolution day Hungary (TV Film)
2008 Csináljuk a fesztivált IV (TV Show Series)
2008 Eon (animation movie)
2008 Fire Dance (TV Film)
2008 És most mi csináljuk a fesztivált (TV Film)
2008 Legend of the dance (TV Series)
2008 Csináljuk a fesztivált III (TV Show Series)
2007 Mi kérünk elnézést (TV Show Series)
2007 Night of the lights (animation film)
2007 Impossible Duetts (TV Show Series) 
2007 Szent István egy Ország születése (TV Film)
2007 Hungary is our family (TV Film)
2007 Csináljuk a fesztivált II (TV Show Series)
2006 Köszönet a szabadság hőseinek, (TV Film)
2006 Csináljuk a fesztivált I (TV Show Series)
2006 Greetings for the Heros of Revolution (TV Film)
2006 Győzike Show outro (TV Show Series)
2005 Mr. Torma, (TV Show Series)
2004 Mohácsi vész, (Feature Film)(Music arranger)
2002 League of the stars (TV Show Series)
2000 E.Tango (TV Show)

References 
Hungarian Theatre database
Imre Czomba Official

1972 births
Music arrangers
Hungarian film score composers
Male film score composers
Hungarian record producers
Hungarian pianists
Living people
Male pianists
21st-century pianists
21st-century Hungarian male musicians